Nature Girl may refer to:

Nature Girl, a single and EP by 18 Wheeler
Nature Girl (novel), a 2006 novel by Carl Hiaasen
"Nature Girl", a cover of the Nat King Cole song "Nature Boy" by Danish rock band Cryoshell.